Shivpuri is a city and a municipality in Shivpuri district located in the central Indian state of Madhya Pradesh. It is in the Gwalior Division of northwest Madhya Pradesh and is the administrative headquarters of Shivpuri District.

The city is a tourist destination in the monsoon season as it has a number of waterfalls like Bhura kho and Tunda Bharkha kho.

Lakes in Shivpuri include Chandpatha jheel, Jadhav Sagar jheel, and other small lakes.

The city is known for its greenery, forests and also as the former summer capital of the Scindia family who at one time ruled the Gwalior. The Indian leader Tatya Tope was hanged in Shivpuri in 1859.. It also refers to a village in Muzaffarnagar.

Geography
Shivpuri is situated at approximately 25.43° north latitude and 77.65° east longitude. By road, Shivpuri is approximately 120 km (74.5 mi) south of Gwalior and 96 km (59.6 mi) west of Jhansi.

Climate 

Shivpuri goes through a subtropical climate like most of the northern regions of India that features three major seasons mainly, a hot summer, a monsoon season, and a cold winter.

Summer 

Summer in Shivpuri arrives in April and lasts till June. During this period Shivpuri remains hot with an average high of 40 °C while the low stays around 26 °C. May is considered as the hottest month of the year when the average high temperature in the city climbs to 43 °C. However, as the season progresses temperature drops slowly.

Monsoon season 

Throughout the monsoon, July–September, Shivpuri experiences a much enjoyable temperature with an average high of 34 °C. The minimum, on the other hand, fluctuates between 20 °C -24 °C.

Winter 

The winter months remains cool and comfortable enough for the people. The season, from November till March, remains somewhat chilly with the average minimums of 8 °C while the low drops to 2 °C.

History
The first historical mention of Sipri (Shivpuri) was of Emperor Akbar hunting elephants there in 1564.

In the 16th Century, Shivpuri, like all of Gwalior, was part the Maratha Empire. The empire weakened at the end of the century, and during the Gardi-ka-wakt, or 'period of unrest', the rajput of Narwar secured the town and district. The Sindhias, under Daulat Scindia, captured the town and district from the ruler of Narwar in 1804, and made the town their summer capital.

See also
 Madhav National Park
 Dhala crater
 Government Medical College, Shivpuri
 List of cities in Madhya Pradesh

==References==

 
Cities in Madhya Pradesh